The PZA Loara (Polish: Przeciwlotniczy Zestaw Artyleryjski or "anti-aircraft artillery system") is a Polish armored radar-directed self-propelled anti-aircraft gun system. The original PZA Loara prototype was based on the chassis of the T-72M tank. The production version known as PZA Loara-A is based on the chassis of the PT-91 MBT.

Description
The system was developed in Poland in the late 1990s by RADWAR S.A. in cooperation with numerous state and industry partners. Work on the project began in 1994 with an emphasis on the PZA variant of the vehicle. A working prototype was completed by the year 2000, which was subsequently submitted for live fire trials in September. It was originally planned that the LOARA program would also include a missile-armed version of the system – called the PZR Loara – a missile-armed version of the vehicle based on the PZA and sharing approx. 70% parts commonality. The PZR was ultimately canceled.

Early prototypes were built on a modified T-72M tank chassis, which saw the driver's compartment relocated to the left side of the hull, the torsion bar suspension system reinforced and the vehicle received an auxiliary power unit with larger capacity batteries necessary to operate the on-board electronics. The current production vehicle is based around the chassis of the PT-91 "Twardy" tank, and mounts a large, armored rotary turret manned by the vehicle commander and gunner/operator. The turret is a welded plate design capable of protecting the crew against small arms fire and shell splinters. The turret contains two banks (2x6) of smoke dischargers and two Oerlikon KDA 35 mm automatic cannons linked to a fire control radar (like on Flakpanzer Gepard).

The KDA is license-built in Poland by Huta Stalowa Wola. It is a gas-operated weapon with a dual belt feed mechanism, driven by a laterally-mounted gas piston operating rod. The air-cooled, fluted barrel has a variable rifling twist and is equipped with a muzzle device that relays muzzle velocities to the fire control computer. The left and right cannons are not interchangeable since their feed systems require a different mounting configuration for each gun. The cannon fires the 35x228 mm round with several types of ammunition, including Ahead "smart" rounds (which have a programmable fuse and directional payload ejection capability, allowing engagement of missiles and other very small targets) and subcaliber FAPDS. The HE ammunition is stored in a magazine at the base of the turret basket and has a capacity for 2x210 rounds. Belts with armour-piercing ammunition (20 rounds per belt) are carried in large magazines on the turret exterior. The turret and gun drive systems are electrical.

The Loara is an autonomous fire unit capable of performing its tasks independently or acting as a component in a wider air defence net. The system has two radars: a 3D search radar with a built-in IFF interrogator and an Ericsson Eagle Mk 1 engagement radar. The search radar has a range of 26 km and is capable of tracking and identifying up to 64 targets at once. The radar system can also be operated on the move, refreshing its data every second. The system also has a DL-1 laser range-finder, a KTVD-1 daytime TV camera as well as a SAGEM Iris FLIR giving the system both all-weather day/night capabilities and the ability to operate entirely passively in a heavily saturated ECM environment. The Loara has a reaction time of under 10 seconds; initial target scanning and acquisition while on the move is carried out by the vehicle commander by means of his stabilized panoramic 8x PSPD-1 periscope sight developed PCO S.A. The system can engage aircraft flying at very low altitudes up to 5,000 m, and flying at speeds of up to 500 m/s. It is also effective against lightly armored ground and naval targets.

The PZA Loara is additionally equipped with a full NBC suit, air-conditioning of the crew compartment.

Former Operators
 : 1 was used, withdrawn from service in 2013.

Awards
It was awarded two awards at International Defence Industry show in Kielce in 2004:
 Defender 2004
 Grand Prix 2004

See also
Flakpanzer Gepard
Marksman
K30 Biho
Type 87
9K22 Tunguska

References

External links
 PZA Loara at the manufacturer's web site (in English).
 35 mm cannon KDA at the manufacturer's web site (in English).
 More information about PZA Loara (in Polish).
 defence orders from India for Polish armoured vehicles.

Armoured fighting vehicles of Poland
Anti-aircraft guns of Poland
Self-propelled anti-aircraft weapons
Science and technology in Poland
Armoured fighting vehicles of the post–Cold War period
35 mm artillery
Military vehicles introduced in the 2000s
Self-propelled artillery of Poland